Tuija Sikiö (born 23 November 1969) is a Finnish biathlete. She competed at the 1992 Winter Olympics and the 1994 Winter Olympics.

References

1969 births
Living people
Biathletes at the 1992 Winter Olympics
Biathletes at the 1994 Winter Olympics
Finnish female biathletes
Olympic biathletes of Finland
Place of birth missing (living people)